Los muertos no hablan (The Dead Do Not Speak) is a 1958 Mexican western film directed by Jaime Salvador, starring Antonio Aguilar as Mauricio Rosales, and Flor Silvestre as Alondra, the femme fatale. The film follows another adventure of the rural policeman in a town notoriously known for its band of criminals led by "Alma Negra". It is the seventh installment of the Mauricio Rosales "El Rayo" film series, and the last subsequently until the 1980 film Sabor a sangre. It was filmed in Mexiscope, a rare cinematographic process specially used in productions of Rodolfo Rosas Priego.

Cast
Antonio Aguilar as Mauricio Rosales
Flor Silvestre	as Alondra
Rina Valdarno as "La Italiana"	
Sara Montes as Violeta	
Agustín Isunza	as Emeterio Berlanga
Diana Ochoa as	Doña Barbara "Alma Negra"
Ángel Infante as Municipal president
Daniel 'Chino' Herrera as "Chinito"
José Eduardo Pérez as Enrique del Olmo
Roberto Meyer as Don Darío
Antonio Raxel as Doctor Aceves
Elena Luquín as Cristina
José Luis Fernández as "Balasuave"
Pedro Padilla as Ricardo Mireles
Mario Sevilla as Hermostenes Rojas

External links

1958 Western (genre) films
1958 films
Mexican Western (genre) films
Films directed by Jaime Salvador
1950s Mexican films
1950s Spanish-language films